Energy–momentum may refer to:
Four-momentum
Stress–energy tensor
Energy–momentum relation